Woods Bagot is a global architectural and consulting practice founded in Adelaide, South Australia. It specialises in the design and planning of buildings across a wide variety of sectors and disciplines. Former names of the practice include Woods & Bagot, Woods, Bagot & Jory; Woods, Bagot, Jory & Laybourne Smith;  Woods, Bagot, Laybourne-Smith & Irwin; and Woods Bagot Architects Pty Ltd.

Founded in 1905, some of their most significant early work includes buildings at the University of Adelaide, including Bonython Hall and the Barr Smith Library. 21st-century projects include the  Qatar Science & Technology Park, Melbourne Convention & Exhibition Centre and the SAHMRI building in Adelaide.

Woods Bagot is now established worldwide, with studios in five regions: Asia, Australia, Europe, the Middle East and North America. In 2015, the firm was named as the world's seventh largest architecture firm by employee count in Building Design magazine.

History
Woods Bagot's origins date back to 1869, when architect Edward John Woods was commissioned to improve and expand the design of St. Peter's Cathedral in Adelaide. In 1905 he joined forces with another prominent local architect, Walter Bagot, and the pair created Woods & Bagot.

Woods retired from the practice known as Woods, Bagot & Jory on 30 June 1915, and Louis Laybourne-Smith became a partner in the practice, causing the practice to be renamed Woods, Bagot, Jory & Laybourne Smith. Woods died in January 1916. Jory left to practise on his own and the practice was dissolved on 30 September 1930, with  James Campbell Irwin (later Lord Mayor of Adelaide) joining the practice, now called Woods, Bagot, Laybourne-Smith & Irwin. Irwin was a senior partner in the firm from 1965 until he retired in 1974.

A summary of the practice's early names:
 1905-1913: Woods & Bagot
 1913–1915: Woods, Bagot & Jory
 1915–1930: Woods, Bagot, Jory & Laybourne Smith
 1930-1974: Woods, Bagot, Laybourne-Smith & Irwin

From 19 June 1974, the firm was registered firstly as Woods Bagot Architects Pty Ltd (until at least 1996), and subsequently as Woods Bagot Pty Ltd.

Current practice
In 2015, the firm was named as the world's seventh largest architecture firm by employee count in Building Design magazine's World Architecture 100 list.

, Woods Bagot has offices in Waymouth Street, Adelaide; Beijing, Hong Kong, Shanghai and Shenzhen in China; London; Abu Dhabi and Dubai in the UAE; Los Angeles, New York and San Francisco in the US; and Singapore.

Architectural style

Inevitably for a firm with whose history spans more than a century, Woods Bagot has embraced a wide variety of architectural styles since its inception. Early Australian buildings such as Bonython Hall were built in the classical Gothic style popular at the time, but the firm's steady expansion into Asia, Europe and North America was accompanied by a corresponding shift in style and approach that embraced a variety of modern and progressive themes.

The firm's latest work is often inspired by the natural world. The South Australian Health and Medical Research Institute (SAHMRI) building's exterior surface is inspired by a pine cone, for example, with a so-called 'living skin' designed for optimal passive solar performance. A new extension to the Adelaide Convention Centre, designed in association with American architect Larry Oltmanns, references local geological forms, in particular the distinctive colours and stratification of the South Australian landscape.

Some recent designs have focused on philosophical as well as environmental and geological themes. The design of the Nan Tien Institute in Wollongong, New South Wales, reflects Buddhist teaching principles, specifically avoiding hierarchical components and providing a neutral environment free of materialism and excess. A new bridge and plaza connecting the Institute to the nearby Nan Tien Temple complex has been designed as a practical, mixed-use focus point for community gatherings, as well as a notable development in its own right. Outside Australia, the Cubism-inspired Cubus, a 25-storey retail tower completed in Hong Kong in 2011, is equipped with geometric lighting panels that emulate the shapes and forms of ice cubes.

Accolades
Woods Bagot was named as the 2009 Architects' Journal AJ100 International Practice of the Year.

Notable projects

Woods Bagot has designed some landmark buildings throughout Australia and the world, including the following major architectural projects:

Early work

In 1915, Woods, Bagot, Jory & Laybourne Smith designed a recreation hall for the Keswick Repatriation Hospital in Keswick, which opened on 11 February 1916.

See also

Architecture of Australia

References

External links
Woods Bagot website

Architecture firms of Australia
1869 establishments in Australia